Rówek  is a settlement in the administrative district of Gmina Ustka, within Słupsk County, Pomeranian Voivodeship, in northern Poland. 

References

Villages in Słupsk County